Nzadi is a Bantu language spoken in the Democratic Republic of the Congo, "from Kwamuntu to Ilebo along the north side of the Kasai River in Bandundu Province." The number of speakers of Nzadi is not known, but is estimated to be in the thousands. The Nzadi language has three dialects, Ngiemba, Lensibun, and Ndzé Ntaa.

Phonology

Vowels 
Nzadi contains seven contrastive vowels, which can be either long or short. The table below shows all the vowel phonemes found in the language:

Consonants

Syllable Structure 
Unlike other Bantu languages, which favor polysyllabic word stems, Nzadi consists primarily of monosyllabic stems. Bisyllabic stems are also present, but they are primarily borrowings or reduplications. 
 Examples
 màáŋgǔl 'mango'
 pɔtpɔ̂t 'mud'
 kamyɔ̂ 'car' (from French camion 'truck')
All stems necessarily begin with a consonant, and monosyllabic stems take four possible structures: CV, CVC, CVV, or CVVC. In the case of bisyllabic stems, both syllables begin with a consonant, and long vowels never occur in the first syllable, and rarely in the second.

Phonological Rules 
As a result of the systematic shortening of word stems, Nzadi words tend to have more vowel clusters than other Bantu languages, and in many cases adjusts one or more of the adjacent vowels by the following processes.

Vowel Coalescence 
When two different vowels occur in succession, one of three things can happen, depending on several factors:

Vowel Shortening 
In cases in which coalescence does not occur, a long vowel followed immediately by another vowel will shorten.
 Examples:
 ibaa + ikwɔ = iba ikwɔ
 esúú na o dzé iba ikwɔ
 'the day that the man ate the banana'
 ibaa + esaa = iba esaa
 esúú na o dzé iba esaa
 'the day that the man ate the food'

Vowel Harmony 
Due to the historical word shortening from Proto-Bantu, Nzadi does not have the stem-level vowel harmony that many other Bantu languages do. However, one kind of harmony does present itself: /e-/ or /o-/ noun prefixes will harmonize to ɛ- or ɔ- if the stem has an identical /ɛ/ or /ɔ/ vowel.

Tone 
Nzadi, like other Bantu languages, has two contrastive tone leves, high (H) and low (L), which can combine to form falling (HL), rising (LH), and rising-falling (LHL) contour tones.

Tone in Nzadi conveys important lexical and grammatical information, and can be the only difference between different words and forms, as seen in the minimal quintuplet here:

General Tone Rules

Tone Absorption 
When a contour tone is followed by another tone that begins with the same tone level as the end of the first, the first tone is simplified by dropping the final tone level. For example, a HL contour followed by a L tone will be simplified to H.
 Examples:
 /mbéè/ 'friend'
mbéé mǐˋ 'my friend'
mbéé tàá 'the father's friend'

Contour Simplification 
Contour simplification is similar to tone absorption, but occurs when adjacent tone levels are different, as seen in the following possessive constructions:

Intonation 
Despite the functional load of tone in Nzadi, intonation can interact or interfere with lexical tones, particularly when a pause in the utterance is taken. In this case, a H boundary tone is inserted.
Example:

References 

Languages of the Democratic Republic of the Congo
Bantu languages